Wyoming Highway 312 (WYO 312) is a  north–south Wyoming State Road located in central Platte County, Wyoming that runs from Wyoming Highway 34 to I-25 BUS/US 87 BUS in Wheatland.

Route description 
Wyoming Highway 312 begins at its south end at Wyoming Highway 34, south-southwest of Wheatland, and travels north towards Wheatland.

History 
Wyoming Highway 312 is the original path that Wyoming Highway 34 used to take into Wheatland before it was realigned to go directly to the Interstate 25.

Major intersections

References

External links 

Wyoming State Routes 300-399
WYO 312 - WYO 34 to I-25 BUS/US 87 BUS/WYO 310
Wheatland, WY Homepage

Transportation in Platte County, Wyoming
312